Great Nicobar Subdivision is one of three local administrative divisions of the Indian district of Nicobar, part of the Indian union territory of Andaman and Nicobar Islands. It is located in the Southern Nicobar Islands.

Administration
The subdivision includes two tehsils: 
 Campbell Bay, which includes the southern part of Great Nicobar and its HQ is Campbell Bay
 Little Nicobar, which includes the northern part of Great Nicobar, as well as nearby islands, and its HQ is at Afra Bay

Image gallery

References 

Nicobar district